Kids Like Us is an American hardcore punk band from north Florida. Formed in 2003, the band drew influences from various subgenres of punk prominent in the scene at the time such as DIY, Garage, and Skate. Known for their over-the-top lyrical vulgarity and aggression, most of the songs they wrote and performed were casual in theme, often relating to skateboarding, eating burritos, straightedge lifestyle, and drinking Coca-Cola. They released three full-length albums and two split albums, and toured with bands such as Down To Nothing, Casey Jones, and the Mongoloids.

History 
Kids Like Us was formed by Lars Lundquist and Brandon Hurst after the break up of xOne Fifthx. They were soon joined by guitarist Clint Penick and released a 5-song demo. Later that year, Kids Like Us signed to Knife or Death Records and released a self-titled full length. In 2004, Kids Like Us signed to Eulogy Recordings and released their second full length, Outta Control. After several member changes, the band released their final full length, The Game, and a split with label-mates the Mongoloids.

References

2003 establishments in Florida
Musical groups established in 2003
Hardcore punk groups from Florida
Eulogy Recordings artists